Jon Blair, CBE, is a South African-born British writer, film producer, and director of documentary films, drama, and comedy.

Biography
Jon Blair was born in South Africa. He was drafted into the South African army in 1966 but chose instead to flee to England. Among numerous awards he has won four of the premier awards in his field: an Oscar, an Emmy (twice), an International Documentary Association Distinguished Achievement Award and a British Academy Award. He was appointed Commander of the Order of the British Empire (CBE) in the 2015 Birthday Honours for services to film. In 1994 Blair was awarded an honorary doctorate by the Richard Stockton College of New Jersey for his contribution to human rights awareness through his film-making work.

In 2003 Blair served as a visiting professor at Stockton teaching a course on researching real world issues to a group of final year cross disciplinary students.

Documentaries
Anne Frank Remembered, written, produced and directed by Blair, is the winner of an Academy Award for Documentary Feature (Oscar), as well as an International Emmy, a CableACE, the International Documentary Association Distinguished Achievement Award, the Audience Award at the International Documentary Film Festival Amsterdam (IDFA), the Jury Award at the Hamptons International Film Festival and a Gold Plaque at the Chicago International Film Festival together with awards for editing and cinematography at the New York Film and Television Festival. It has also been featured at the Melbourne, Montreal and Toronto International Film Festivals (all non-competitive). The film was distributed theatrically in the UK, North America and Australia.

Blair is the winner of a British Academy Award for Best Documentary for his 1983 film, Schindler, which preceded Steven Spielberg's feature by 10 years and was used extensively by Spielberg as a research resource. Schindler was narrated by Dirk Bogarde and written, produced and directed by Blair.
In 2019, he re-released Schindler in high definition with Ben Kingsley as the narrator.

Most recently Blair won the 2022 Monte Carlo Television Festival Gold Nymph Award for Best Current Affairs Film for his feature documentary Navalny - The Man Putin Couldn't Kill of which the Guardian said "horror and absurdity jostle for space in this fascinating documentary". The Daily Telegraph called it "an extraordinary and bizarrely entertaining film" while The Sunday Telegraph said it is "a film brimming with the banality of evil."

Between January 2011 and July 2013 Blair was in charge of Major Series and Documentary Specials for the broadcaster Al Jazeera English. In late 2011 he had the Discussions brief added to his portfolio. During his time at Al Jazeera he commissioned and executive produced a range of one-off documentaries and series as well as creating new talk show formats. As Executive Producer of Bahrain: Shouting in the Dark, directed by May Ying Welsh for Al Jazeera, Jon won a Robert F Kennedy Journalism Award, an Amnesty International Media Award, a UK Foreign Press Association Feature Story of the Year Award, a George Polk Award for Journalism, and a Scripps Howard Foundation Jack R Howard Award, and was nominated for a British Academy Award and a Royal Television Society Award. In 2012 Blair was asked to create formats and commission high-profile series and one-off documentaries for Al Jazeera's new American channel and in that capacity he commissioned some of the United States' best known non-fiction film makers to make a range of documentaries and series to be shown in 2014.

Before he joined Al Jazeera, Blair's feature documentary Dancing with the Devil premiered at the Silverdocs Festival in the US in June 2009 and had its Latin American premiere at the Festival do Rio, the Rio de Janeiro Film Festival in October 2009. Peter Bradshaw of The Guardian described Dancing with the Devil as "horribly fascinating", it portrays the bloody battle between drug lords and police in Rio de Janeiro where more than 1000 people die each year.

During 2007 and early 2008, Blair made Ochberg's Orphans for Rainmaker Films, about the 1921 expedition of one Isaac Ochberg who saved nearly 200 orphans from the wreckage of post-revolutionary Russia. The film was shortlisted for an Oscar for Short Documentary.

In August 2007 Blair completed Murder Most Foul a 75-minute feature documentary for More 4 about crime in South Africa with the ex-South African Shakespearean actor, Sir Antony Sher.

In 2006, Blair produced and directed a multi episode comedy series for BBC1, Dawn French's Girls Who Do: Comedy. In 2005 Jon made two one-hour drama documentaries for Discovery Networks Europe in the Zero Hour series, about the Oklahoma bomb and the plot to kill Pope John Paul II. Prior to that he worked as an Executive Producer for Discovery for eight months. 

In 2003–04, he produced a four-hour series – of which he produced, wrote and directed 3 hours – Reporters at War, a first hand history of war reporting, featuring some of the most famous American and British war reporters through the ages. The Series won an Emmy in the US for Best Historical Programming. His feature length opening programme of the series won the Broadcasting Press Guild Award for best multi-channel programme for 2003 and was nominated for the Broadcast Award for Best Multi-Channel Programme for 2003/4, as well as receiving an Honourable Mention at Banff. The Series also received a Gold Medal at the New York Festivals.

Following a programme on Bin Laden: the Early Years for Channel Four after 11 September 2001, in 2002 he was series producer, as well as director and writer of two episodes of the four-part series The Age of Terror. The series made by 3BM Television received wide critical acclaim including an International Documentary Association Award nomination and winning the Broadcast Award for Best Multi-Channel Programme for 2002. The series was also nominated for a Banff Documentary Award.

Also in 2002, Blair produced, wrote, directed and narrated The Meyssan Conspiracy, about a 9/11 conspiracy theory, for Channel Four Science and then a rapid turn-round special, also for Channel Four, on the Bali bombing. He was also a contributor to The Times Special Supplement on the first anniversary of the 11 September tragedy.

As a producer/director on the British TV shows Tonight, This Week and TV Eye, Blair covered domestic and foreign political and economic stories including the first programme about the 1976 Soweto uprising for British television, There Is No Crisis!, and coverage of wars in the Middle East, Cambodia and Angola. As a war correspondent/feature writer he has contributed to The Times, The Sunday Times, The Observer, The Economist and The New York Times. He has also been a book reviewer for the Los Angeles Times.

Having created one of the first independent production companies in England with Spitting Image Productions, Blair set up his own company, Jon Blair Films, in 1987. The company's first production was a feature documentary co-produced with BBC1 which Jon produced, directed and wrote, Do You Mean There Are Still Real Cowboys?. It tells the story of a year in the life of the small cow town in Wyoming where the actress Glenn Close's parents now live. The feature-length version was narrated by Robert Redford.
 
Blair then wrote and produced a drama documentary for Channel Four, The Kimberley Carlile Inquiry based on Louis Blom-Cooper's inquiry into the circumstances surrounding that infamous case of child abuse. The production starred Julie Covington, Brian Cox, Kenneth Cranham, Daniel Day-Lewis, Trevor Eve, Alan Howard, Anna Massey, Diana Quick, Zoe Wanamaker, and others.

Other productions included an early example of a formatted documentary, Thighs, Lies & Beauty, an investigation of the myths and reality surrounding the beauty business for BBC1; The Art of Tripping, a 2-hour dramatised documentary for Channel Four on drug taking and the arts starring Bernard Hill; a Frontline (Channel Four) current affairs film featuring the story of South African Jann Turner whose father was assassinated in front of her when she was 13, and as an adult returns to South Africa to look at the arguments for revenge versus reconciliation in the new South Africa; Steven Spielberg on "Schindler's List" and Tom Hanks & The World According to Gump, both for the BBC; and Wagner vs Wagner, for Channel Four, featuring Richard Wagner's great grandson on the composer's political and cultural legacy of anti-semitism and race hatred.

Theatrically released films
Both Anne Frank Remembered and Dancing with the Devil have been released theatrically, the former by Sony Pictures Classics in the US. 

In 1991 Blair produced and his company made the feature film, Monster in a Box, Spalding Gray's sequel to his earlier work, Swimming to Cambodia. The film, directed by documentarian Nick Broomfield, and distributed in the US by Fineline Features consists of a long-form monologue by Gray detailing the trials and tribulations he encountered when writing his eponymous first novel. The soundtrack music was composed by Laurie Anderson. The film achieved the ultimate accolade of being parodied on Sesame Street as an instalment of Monsterpiece Theater, with the main actor and writer aptly called Spalding Monster in a homage to Gray. With rather more pathos the film also contains a number of references to Gray's suicidal thoughts of drowning, thereby hinting at his eventual death in 2004, when he is thought to have jumped off the Staten Island Ferry in New York.

Drama/comedy
Blair was co-founder and co-creator of Spitting Image, acting as producer and then executive producer until mid 1987. He was also executive producer of all Spitting Image specials for NBC and HBO in the US. In his time at Spitting Image as producer or executive producer the programme won two Emmies, a Banff comedy award, and numerous other international awards. 

Blair produced Dunrulin''' for BBC1, a satirical comedy based on his own idea featuring the Thatcher family in retirement starring Angela Thorne and John Wells. He also made The Stone Age by Ian Hislop and Nick Newman for BBC1 and starring Trevor Eve. Other comedy productions include Packing Them In and Blue Heaven, both starring Frank Skinner and both for Channel Four. There was also the light-hearted dramatised documentary Sindy Hits Thirty, with Sandi Toksvig, for Channel Four. 

Theatre
Blair is the author of The Biko Inquest, a play based on the inquest in South Africa into the death in prison of the black leader, Steve Biko. The play, originally written for television, and then later adapted for the Royal Shakespeare Company, pioneered the use of drama in current affairs. Blair directed the play-off Broadway in New York, starring Fritz Weaver and Philip Bosco, where it received considerable critical acclaim and ran for four months. After successful productions around the world it was produced on the London stage, and also for television, starring Albert Finney. The New York Times'' review said of this production that it was "extraordinarily effective" and that "the entire ensemble is so remarkably convincing that we are forced to remind ourselves that they are actors."

A version of the play with an all-black cast was staged in Nigeria in 1979 directed by and starring the writer, poet, playwright and Nobel laureate Wole Soyinka.

References

External links
 
Sony classics biography
Sony classics interview with Jon Blair
Site for Dancing with the Devil film
Guardian Review of Dancing with the devil
Site for Anne Frank Remembered film
Site for Jon Blair Film Company Ltd

1950 births
American Experience
Directors of Best Documentary Feature Academy Award winners
Emmy Award winners
Grammy Award winners
Living people
South African film directors
South African Commanders of the Order of the British Empire